The 1970 Scottish League Cup final was played on 24 October 1970 and was the final of the 25th Scottish League Cup competition. The match was an Old Firm derby between Rangers and Celtic. Rangers won the match 1–0, thanks to a goal by the then 16-year-old Derek Johnstone.

Match details

References

External links
 Soccerbase

1970
League Cup Final
Celtic F.C. matches
Rangers F.C. matches
1970s in Glasgow
October 1970 sports events in the United Kingdom
Old Firm matches